This is a list of cities in Laos, a country in Asia.

Towns and cities

Gallery

See also

 Provinces of Laos
 Districts of Laos

References

External links

 
Laos, List of cities in
Cities
Laos

simple:List of cities in Laos